Montano Antilia is a town and comune of the province of Salerno in the Campania region of south-west Italy.

History
Originally known as "Montagna" and after "Montana", it was founded on the ruins of an Ancient Greek settlement. It was a casale (i.e. farmstead) belonging to Cuccaro Vetere, first mentioned in a population census of the 16th century.

Geography
Montano Antilia is located in southern Cilento, is part of its national park and borders with the municipalities of Celle di Bulgheria, Centola, Futani, Laurito, Novi Velia, Rofrano and San Mauro la Bruca. Its hamlets (frazioni) are the villages of Abatemarco (pop.: 309) and Massicelle (pop.: 529).

See also
Cilentan dialect
Cilentan Coast

References

External links

 Official website 

Cities and towns in Campania
Localities of Cilento